Thikriwala is a village in Barnala district in Indian state of Punjab. It is located 5 km away from Barnala. It is among the largest and oldest villages in Punjab.
In Punjabi language thikri means shard, so this village gets its name because people of vast gotra and casts live here.
Thikriwala is birthplace of freedom fighter Sardar Sewa Singh Thikriwala, the ancestor of Jagmeet Singh leader of New Democratic Party Canada. Every year on 18, 19 and 20 January a barsi (death anniversary function) is organized in village to commemorate Sardar Sewa Singh.

Education 

There is one Government Primary School and two Government Senior Secondary School in Thikriwala. Few other private institutions are also serving the society.

Demographics 

As of 2011 India census, Thikriwala had a population of 10080. Males constitute 54% of population and female 46%. In Thikriwala, 11% of the population was under 6 years of age. Overall literacy rate is 63%.

Notable people from Thikriwala 
 The ancestors of Jagmeet Singh leader of New Democratic Party Canada.

References 

Villages in Barnala district